Stefan Petrov Topurov (born August 11, 1964 in Asenovgrad), is a former weightlifter, Olympian and World Champion from Bulgaria.

He was the first lifter to clean & jerk 3 times his body weight, with a 180 kg lift in the 60 kg division at the 1983 World Weightlifting Championships.

Career

Olympics
His only Olympic appearance was at the 1988 Seoul Olympics in the 60 kg division against his former teammate Naim Süleymanoğlu. In the end Naim would put on the most dominating display of weightlifting of all time, but Stefan had a dominating performance of his own, winning the silver medal with a total of 312.5 kg, a full 25.0 kg above the bronze medalist Ye Huanming.

Major results

Weightlifting achievements 
 Silver medalist in Olympic Games (1988);
 Senior world champion (1987);
 Silver medalist in Senior World Championships (1983 and 1986);
 Senior European champion (1984 and 1987);
 Silver medalist at Senior European Championships (1983 and 1988);
 Set eleven world records during his career.
 First man ever to lift three times his body weight.

References

Notes 
1.The 1983 World Championships in Moscow was also the European Championships

1964 births
Living people
Bulgarian male weightlifters
People from Asenovgrad
Olympic weightlifters of Bulgaria
Weightlifters at the 1988 Summer Olympics
Olympic silver medalists for Bulgaria
Olympic medalists in weightlifting
Medalists at the 1988 Summer Olympics
European Weightlifting Championships medalists
World Weightlifting Championships medalists
20th-century Bulgarian people
21st-century Bulgarian people